Mitchel Scanlon is a British writer of science fiction novels and comics. He wrote novels for the Warhammer 40,000 franchise, and novels featuring 2000 AD character Judge Anderson. He also writes a comic series called Tales of Hellbrandt Grimm.

Biography

Warhammer 40,000 books
 Fifteen Hours (Black Library, 2005)
 Descent of Angels (Black Library, 2007)
 Call to Arms (Black Library, 2010)

Judge Anderson books
 Fear the Darkness (Black Flame, 2006)
 Red Shadows (Black Flame, 2006)
 Sins of the Father (Black Flame, 2007)

Sources
 Lexicanum
 FictionDB

English science fiction writers
English comics writers
Year of birth missing (living people)
Living people